The Aberto da República is a professional tennis tournament played on outdoor clay courts. It is currently part of the ITF Women's World Tennis Tour and has been held annually in Rio de Janeiro, Brazil, since 2021. It was previously part of the ATP Challenger Tour and previously held in Brasília, Brazil.

Past finals

Men's singles

Women's singles

Men's doubles

Women's doubles

External links 
 ATP Tournament overview

ATP Challenger Tour
ITF Women's World Tennis Tour
Clay court tennis tournaments
Recurring sporting events established in 2021
Sport in Brasília
Tennis tournaments in Brazil